Lotte Specht (15 October 1911 – 10 February 2002) was a German football player. In 1930, she founded 1. Deutscher Damenfußballclub (1. DDFC) the first womens football team in Germany.

Literature 
 Lotte Specht. In: Ronny Galczynski: Frauenfußball von A–Z. Humboldt, Hannover 2010, ISBN 978-3-86910-169-9, Page 269.

References

External links
 Official site

1911 births
2002 deaths
People from Frankfurt
German women's footballers
Women's association footballers not categorized by position